Antonio Neri (29 February 1576, Florence – 1614) was a Florentine priest who published the book L’Arte Vetraria or The Art of Glass in 1612. This book was the first general treatise on the systematics of glassmaking.

Early life and education
Neri's father was a physician. Neri entered the priesthood in 1601. He then became a member of the household of Alamanno Bertolini where he met the chemist Sir Emmanuel Ximenes, who introduced Neri to the fundamentals of glassmaking. Bertolini was a member of the Medici royal family, and his household in Florence was known as Casino di San Marco. Various glassmakers visited the Bartolini household from time-to-time, giving Neri ample opportunity to learn glassmaking and to eventually develop improved formulations.

In one account, he is known as Antonio Lodovico Neri.

Career

Prior to Neri's time, glassmaking was part of the field of alchemy, and Neri had a background in alchemy. Through his efforts and those of glassmaking contemporaries of Neri, glassmaking began to evolve into a systematic scientific endeavor. An example is that Neri recognized that the red color in the red glass called "crocus martis" is due to oxidized iron.

Neri traveled extensively in Italy, Antwerp, and Holland. Much of his time in Antwerp was spent with chemist Sir Emmanuel Ximenes from whom Neri learned much of the basic chemistry of glassmaking. Neri also worked in the glasshouses belonging to the Medici family in Florence and in Pisa. These experiences significantly deepened his knowledge of glassmaking and its underlying chemistry. Neri's other endeavors included herbalism and alchemy, in addition to glassmaking.

Much of what is known about Neri's life are based on correspondence between Neri and Ximenes in addition to research conducted by Muranese glass historian Luigi Zecchin during the 1960s. An annotated bibliography of written works by Neri has been published. Much of the correspondence between Neri and Ximenes is preserved at the Biblioteca Nazionale Centrale di Firenze.

Systematics of Glassmaking
Between 1598 and 1600, Neri published his first compilation on glassmaking, Il Tesoro del Mondo, which included some basic information on equipment and raw materials for glassmaking. He was at the same time conducting his own experimentation on glassmaking in the household of his Medici family patron in Florence. Following the publication of Il Tesoro del Mondo, Neri began his travels to Antwerp and Pisa, during which time he interacted more frequently with Ximenes. He returned to Florence in 1611, publishing L'Arte Vetraria the following year.

In 1612, Neri published a seven volume treatise, L' Arte Vetraria, that was a significant step toward systematizing the preparation of glass. The title of the book translates to English as The Art of Glass. The first volume describes the materials, mixing, and melting of the ingredients to produce crystals and colorless glass. Subsequent volumes describe colored glasses, leaded glass, artificial gemstones, enamels, and glass paints. The treatise includes many glass formulations that were devised by Neri by improving on formulations that he became aware of through his work in the Medici court, through his interactions with Ximenez, and likely other sources.

The contents of L'Arte Vetraria volume-by-volume are:
 Basic glass colors and preparation
 Chalcedony glass
 Advanced colors
 Lead glass and colors
 Artificial gemstones
 Vitreous enamel 
 Paints and transparent red glass

L'Arte Vetraria went through three editions up until 1817. By 1752, it had been translated into Dutch, French, and English.

While Neri's contemporary Galileo Galilei made note of L'Arte Vetraria, more widespread recognition of the treatise came later. In 1662, British physician and scientist Christopher Merret published an English translation of L'Arte Vetraria, which included extensive annotations by Merret. Subsequent translations were usually based on Merret's version of Neri's treatise. By 1900, there were an estimated two dozen translations based on Merret's version or on Neri's original version. The L'Arte Vetraria was a standard reference book among glassmakers up until approximately 1900 and served to much enhance the ability of glassmakers to improve upon prior glassmaking processes.

See also
List of Roman Catholic scientist-clerics

References

External links
 

L'arte vetraria distinta in libri sette (The art of glass), 1612 edition printed by Nella Stamperia de'Giunti in Firenze. Held by the Corning Museum of Glass. (Accessed 17 April 2014)
The art of glass, 1662 edition printed by A.W. for O. Pulleyn in London, England. Originally owned by King Charles II. Held by the Corning Museum of Glass. (Accessed 17 April 2014)

Glass makers
1614 deaths
Italian non-fiction writers
Italian male non-fiction writers
Italian chemists
17th-century Italian Roman Catholic priests
Catholic clergy scientists
17th-century Italian scientists
Clergy from Florence
1576 births
Scientists from Florence